Urdhë ( is a sort of whey cheese that is found in Albania, but also commonly used by Albanians in Kosovo, Montenegro, Greece, Serbia and North-Macedonia.

Etymology

The etymology of Urdhë is an alternative variant of hurdhë. From Proto-Albanian *wurdā, from an earlier *urdā or *uordā, from Proto-Indo-European *uer- (“to boil, to burn”). Cognate to Old Armenian վառիմ (vaṙim, “to burn”), Lithuanian vìrti (“to cook, to boil”). The Albanian term Urdhë is cognate to the Romanian word urdă and Aromanian urdâ, which are attributed to a pre-Latin Balkan substrate language.

Urdhë is traditionally made from whey of sheep, goat or cow milk. the unsalted cheese is produced by warming the whey resulting from the draining of any type of cheese. Later, it is formed into molds to the shape of variant geometric shapes and sizes,  The paste is finely grained, silky and smooth.

References

Whey cheeses
Albanian cuisine